Harold Theopolis "Harry" Osborn is a fictional character appearing in American comic books published by Marvel Comics, commonly in association with the superhero Spider-Man. Created by Stan Lee and Steve Ditko, the character first appeared in The Amazing Spider-Man #31 (December 1965).

Harry is the best friend of Peter Parker (Spider-Man's alter ego) and Flash Thompson, one of the ex-boyfriends of Mary Jane Watson, the son of Norman Osborn, the husband of Liz Allan and the father of Normie and Stanley Osborn. He is the second character to assume the Green Goblin alias while one of his clones was amongst the many users of the Iron Patriot armor as the superhero American Son. He is also the creator of Gabriel and Sarah Stacy who are both later to be operating as his demonic revenant Kindred. 

The character has appeared in many adaptations of Spider-Man outside of the comic books, including various cartoons and video games. James Franco portrayed the character in Sam Raimi's Spider-Man film trilogy (2002—2007), and Dane DeHaan portrays the character in The Amazing Spider-Man 2 (2014).

Publication history
Harry Osborn first appeared in The Amazing Spider-Man #31 (December 1965), and was created by writer Stan Lee and artist Steve Ditko.

In The Amazing Spider-Man #122 (July 1973), Harry's father, Norman, is killed off, and a subplot leading to Harry inheriting his father's identity as the Green Goblin is introduced. This subplot culminates in The Amazing Spider-Man #136 (September 1974). Writer Gerry Conway said that the idea of Harry Osborn becoming the Green Goblin stemmed in part from a desire to deal with the consequences of the psychedelic drugs Harry began using in The Amazing Spider-Man #96 (May 1971). Conway said that he had had experience with such drugs himself, and that "with psychedelic drugs, hallucinogens, if they've been misused, there is a potential for additional hallucinogenic experiences that are completely beyond your control or volition. I could imagine Harry getting hit by something like that, in the fragile emotional state following the death of his father, and losing touch with reality, as a result. Besides, I never had any intention of getting rid of the Green Goblin as a concept forever, so it all came together".

Harry dies in The Spectacular Spider-Man #200 (May 1993). Artist Sal Buscema said that drawing the final two pages of this issue was a deeply emotional experience for him due to how long he had drawn the character, and felt it was appropriate that writer J. M. DeMatteis chose not to add any dialogue to those pages.

Several years later, the Spider-Man writers made plans to reveal that the mysterious villain Gaunt was Harry Osborn, who was still alive and had orchestrated the entire "Clone Saga", but an editorial edict prevented this from coming to fruition. However, Harry was eventually revived in The Amazing Spider-Man #545 (December 2007). He received an entry in the Official Handbook of the Marvel Universe Update '89 #5.

Fictional character biography
Harry is the only son of Norman Osborn and Emily Lyman. The circumstances of Harry's birth weakens Emily, and she dies after a long illness. Heartbroken, Norman becomes a cold and unloving father; Norman either contemptuously dismisses Harry or lashes out at him in fury. As a result, Harry spends much of his life trying desperately to earn his father's approval. Unbeknownst to him, however, Norman had traded his son's soul to the demon Mephisto in exchange for wealth and power, and Harry would be cursed for the rest of his life while Norman forgot the deal.

Upon graduating from high school, Harry enrolls in Empire State University. Among the wealthiest students in the school, Harry soon becomes one of the most popular as well, despite his aloof manner. He has a clique of rich, popular students around him; one of these is the lovely Gwen Stacy. Gwen is intrigued by a new student: bookish, studious and painfully-shy Peter Parker. Harry takes a dislike to Parker; he resents the attention Gwen pays to Peter, and he assumes that Peter's standoffishness is snobbery. After confronting Parker, Harry realizes that Peter is merely shy and is also worried about his ailing aunt May Parker. Despite this rocky start, Harry and Peter became friends, eventually sharing an apartment.

Harry does not realize that his best friend is the superhero Spider-Man, nor that his father became the supervillain Green Goblin in an accident while attempting to create a super-serum. Moreover, before he became friends with Harry, Spider-Man was unmasked and captured by Green Goblin. During the subsequent battle, an electric shock removed all memory of being Green Goblin from Norman's mind. Spider-Man then hid all evidence of Norman's double identity, to keep Harry from being hurt by the revelation.

However, Norman's Green Goblin persona resurfaces from time to time. These are difficult times for Harry, as his father's periodic episodes are unexplainable. He had experimented with drugs in his teens; but he escalates his usage, as well as trying ever-harder substances. This affects his mental stability and his relationships with his friends. Spider-Man uses this to his advantage during one battle with Green Goblin; he is able to stop the fight by showing Norman his son's emaciated condition, brought on by an accidental drug overdose. The sight shocks Norman so much that it brings him back to sanity.

Green Goblin

Harry is dumped by Mary Jane Watson due to being fed up with his self-destructive lifestyle. Disconsolate, Harry turns to drugs and overdoses on amphetamines. He recovers at home instead of at a hospital, as Norman wanted to keep the matter quiet, and a doctor diagnoses him with schizophrenia. This tragedy, compounded by imminent bankruptcy, drives Norman over the edge. The elder Osborn kidnaps Gwen as bait for Spider-Man, and then throws her off the George Washington Bridge (or Brooklyn Bridge). In a vicious battle with Spider-Man, the Green Goblin accidentally impales himself on his own goblin glider. Harry Osborn secretly witnesses this. Wanting to protect his father's identity, he strips Norman Osborn's body of the Green Goblin costume. Blaming Spider-Man for his father's "murder", Harry, angry and mentally unbalanced, swears vengeance. Having inherited his father's company, Harry manages to get the business back in shape. One day, to his shock, he finds a Spider-Man costume in Peter Parker's apartment and realizes that his best friend is the man he blames for his father's death. Using his father's old equipment, Harry confronts Peter as the second Green Goblin.

Not wanting to hurt Harry, Peter avoids fighting his old friend. After Spider-Man is able to thwart Harry's initial attempt on his life, Harry is knocked unconscious and taken into police custody. There, he raves that he is the true Green Goblin and Peter Parker is Spider-Man, but is dismissed as a lunatic. He is put in the care of criminal psychologist Dr. Bart Hamilton to extract the Green Goblin secrets from Harry through hypnosis, and buries the knowledge deep within Harry's mind. Hamilton then raids one of Harry's hideouts and becomes the third Green Goblin. Meanwhile, Harry is released and considered cured. He sustains a concussion that makes him forget his knowledge of Spider-Man's identity and he and Peter rekindle their friendship.

For a while, Harry's life seems back on track; his company begins turning profits once more, and he develops a romance with Liz Allan after they meet at the wedding of Betty Brant and Ned Leeds. Not long after the two are married, and eventually they have their son Normie Osborn named in memory of the boy's grandfather. Harry also gives his blessing to the marriage of Peter and Mary Jane Watson. However, Harry starts regaining his memories when he is blackmailed by the original Hobgoblin (Roderick Kingsley) with a package which contains evidence that his father was the original Green Goblin. When Hobgoblin learns he had raided all of Norman's hideouts, he leaves Harry alone, knowing he had nothing more to offer him. Later, Harry is forced to act as Green Goblin a few times, once to defeat the second Hobgoblin (Jason Macendale). This Hobgoblin is seeking the Goblin Formula that gave the Green Goblin superhuman strength; Harry is able to defeat him by doubling back during an aerial chase and emptying his entire supply of pumpkin bombs onto Hobgoblin. Harry even wonders if he could use the Green Goblin persona for a career as a superhero, but Peter convinces him that Green Goblin had too much baggage for such a role. Harry buries the Green Goblin menace within his mind once more and focuses on his business and family.

Death
This tranquility is shattered when the aftereffects of the "Inferno" crisis sunder the barrier between Harry's conscious and subconscious minds. Once again, he remembers being Green Goblin—and his hatred of Spider-Man. Harry has now convinced himself that Peter Parker resents the Osborns' "stable family life" due to never having been wanted by his own parents or guardians, when in fact it was the complete opposite. He uses Peter's trust in him to capture him, and subjects him to hallucinogenic gases to psychologically torment him. He finds himself unsatisfied with this revenge, however, and decides to kill Spider-Man. However, given the opportunity he proves unwilling to kill his best friend.

Harry investigates his father's old hideouts and notes, and finally uncovers and ingests the formula for the original Green Goblin's superhuman strength. He then kidnaps his wife, son, and brother-in-law Mark Raxton, terrorizing them in an old family mansion. Raxton manages to signal their location to Spider-Man who defeats the Green Goblin and turns him in to the police. Spider-Man pushes for Harry to get psychiatric treatment from Dr. Ashley Kafka, but he is ultimately transferred to the Vault. However, the state is unable to put together a sufficient case against Harry, and after just a few weeks in prison, he is released.

Harry discovers that his father developed an advanced version of the Goblin Formula, but was unable to test it before his final battle with Spider-Man. After testing it, he ingests the new formula. When he spies Spider-Man investigating his townhouse, Harry loses his temper and attacks him as the Green Goblin. He injects Peter with a drug that leaves him immobile and, in a fit of depression, activates timed explosives that he had planted throughout the townhouse, planning to kill both himself and Peter. However, when he realizes that Mary Jane and his son Normie are also in the townhouse, he is shocked back to his normal self. Harry rescues Mary Jane, Normie, and Peter before he collapses. He belatedly realizes that he did not test the new formula diligently enough, and that it is, in fact, lethal before he dies holding Peter's hand.

Post-mortem
Sometime before his death, Harry created a computer system with copies of his and Norman Osborn's minds programmed into it; after Harry's death, the computer system activates and abducts Normie Osborn with the intent of subjecting him to the Green Goblin Serum (the same one that had caused Harry's death) to make into the newest Green Goblin. This computer facsimile of Harry and its robotic drones (which resemble female versions of Green Goblin) were all destroyed by Spider-Man and the Molten Man who manage to save Normie from it. However, Harry had one last trick up his sleeve. Sometime before his final confrontation with Spider-Man, Harry had employed the Chameleon to construct Life Model Decoys of Peter's parents to play with his emotions. The plot ends with both constructs revealed as fakes when both "die", shattering Peter's mind. After nearly killing the Chameleon, Peter found a tape Harry had left before he died revealing his role in the plot and mocking Peter, demonstrating that Harry was as manipulative and cruel as his father when gripped by insanity. Peter goes temporarily insane from the shock, even briefly rejecting his identity until the return of his clone Ben Reilly snaps him back to reality.

Some time later Spider-Man encountered another digital version of Harry's mind, this one a hologram created by a group of rebel Scriers. This group had reconstructed Harry from all available information about him in the hope of using him to manipulate Normie, who they wished to use as a weapon against his grandfather. This Harry, possessing all the memories of the original, refuses to entertain the idea of his son becoming a killer, and assists Spider-Man in defeating the leader of the group. He then explains to Normie that Spider-Man is not an enemy and thanks Peter for all his help over the years. As the hologram disappears the badly injured Scrier grabs Normie with the intent of killing him, but someone - implied to be Harry - grabs the Scrier from out of the darkness and breaks his neck.

'Return from the grave'
After Mephisto's manipulations of the timeline, details of Harry's death are seemingly retconned as being faked by Mysterio and his father who spirits his son away to Europe where he is held prisoner in several "rehab" clinics and believes that his son had relapsed into drug addiction, and this, in turn, led to his brief return to wearing the Green Goblin costume. Prior to Mephisto's alterations, Harry's body was exhumed and tested, indicating he was dead. However, this is explained to have been a "genetic duplicate" provided by Mysterio to fool anyone who investigated later, indicating he was alive all along and Peter simply did not know.

At some point, Harry is released from rehab and reunites with his friends. However, because Peter recruited Dr. Strange, Mr. Fantastic, and Iron Man to help him wipe out all evidence and memory of Spider-Man's secret identity (save from Mary Jane), Harry recalls his actions as the second Green Goblin but no longer remembers that Peter Parker is the web-slinger. His marriage to Liz Allan disintegrates and the two divorce. Harry engages in a string of relationships, several of which result in Harry marrying and divorcing in rapid fashion. He is in a relationship with Lily Hollister. Harry tries to help Lily's father in the latter's bid for Mayor of New York by funding her father's campaign with his dwindling finances.

Harry is also one of the leading suspects for the secret identity of a new Goblin. In the "New Ways to Die" story arc, Menace battles Norman Osborn and is infuriated when Norman states that all he cares about is killing Spider-Man. Norman dons the Green Goblin costume and mentions that Harry has been in the Green Goblin's lair. Norman calls Harry, who realizes from Norman's distorted voice that Norman is wearing the Green Goblin suit. This horrifies and disgusts Harry, who vows to stop his father. Harry angrily confronts his father, who wants Harry to follow his legacy and become a greater man. The confused Harry is saved by Spider-Man. Spider-Man, who wants to beat Norman senseless, stops when he sees an area for human testing. Harry is claimed to be the one responsible for the atrocious acts, although he attempts to plead innocence. Harry later states that he wants to talk to Peter, who moments earlier was kissed by Lily, and is seen leaving with a mysterious canister labelled "Prometheus X-90".

Prometheus X-90, it is revealed later, was developed as a successful cure for Mark Raxton's condition as Molten Man. The only human test subject was Charlie Weiderman, the short-lived second Molten Man, and the only person on whom the serum could be tested. After the cure is administered, Liz finally forgives Harry and gives him back the wedding ring, which she originally claimed she lost.

Renting out all of Liberty Island, Harry takes Lily there and, at the top of the Statue of Liberty, he gets down on one knee and proposes to her. Lily rejects his proposal because she is not sure where their relationship will lead, which surprises Harry. He later goes to her place to check up on her, and as he enters the room he is surprised to discover Lily wearing the Menace costume.

She found a hidden door in his closet and one of his old journals. She begins giving him a hard time about whining so much about his father. Harry thinks her behavior is because she is sick. She continues to tell him she uncovered one of Norman's secret rooms described in the journal. This explains why she kissed Peter after the Thunderbolts attacked; he almost found the secret trigger to open the room. When she first entered the room, she found the Green Goblin's equipment and some experiments. Knocking over some chemicals, she absorbed them and is now able to transform at will. She explains that she discovered Menace's attacks against her father gives him more public support. She also tells him that she accepts his marriage proposal. After their talk, Harry enters one of his father's weapons caches, takes a glider (filled with bombs and winged bombs), a pair of Goblin gloves, a sword, and a dart gun containing an unknown chemical. In the midst of a battle between Menace and Spider-Man, Harry confronts and shoots her with that chemical, which is a type of antidote that reverts her back to her human form. He saves Spider-Man from the crowd and leaves. Lily is incarcerated but later escapes, leaving Harry her ring and a note.

Dark Reign
Harry is approached by Norman with the offer of a job within the Dark Avengers. Harry initially declines, but accepts his father's offer after learning that Lily Hollister is pregnant. Norman welcomes Harry into Avengers Tower, wanting to make his son into the American Son. Harry is shown to have an ulterior motive, however, based on his compulsion to protect Lily and his child. Disabling the camera in his room, Harry sneaks off. He finds a cure for Lily's condition that will be safe for both Lily and the baby, but Lily pushes him away. Lily reveals that it is a ruse to coerce Harry into taking on the American Son armor, whom Norman had plotted would die in a tragedy to increase sympathy for Norman and the Dark Avengers. Lily also reveals that the baby is not Harry's but, in fact, Norman's. In retaliation for this, Harry dons his American Son armor, and fights Norman in his Iron Patriot armor. During the battle, Norman declares that Harry is no longer his son, and that Norman has bred a better child to replace the 'failure' of Harry. After further taunts from Norman, Harry lashes out and defeats his father, declaring "I was never your son!". When Harry has the option of killing Norman, Spider-Man tells him to decapitate Norman, since his father's healing factor may repair a blow to the head. Spider-Man also cautions Harry that killing Norman will cause Harry to "become the son Norman always wanted". Seeing what he may become with his actions, Harry instead backs down, and turns away from his father forever.

Harry is next seen in a psychiatrist's office, claiming to be getting over the effects of a medical treatment he received. The doctor offers to prescribe him oxycodone but it is not revealed if Harry takes the prescription.

Afterwards, Harry is cut off financially and is forced out of his penthouse apartment. He moves into Peter's old room at May Parker's. He also begins secretly dating Amy Reilly (Peter's cousin). After May returns and is corrupted by Mister Negative, she kicks Harry out of the house, forcing him to move in with Mary Jane Watson.

Heroic Age
After Norman's fall, the American Son armor is stolen and the police begin questioning Harry, as only someone of the Osborn bloodline can use the American Son armor. Harry is then shot in the chest by Gabriel Stacy, claiming that Norman gave Harry a better life. However, Harry is saved by American Son and taken to a hospital. After Harry recovers from his wounds, he is escorted home by police. Fearing the damage that could be done with the American Son armor and perplexed by his encounter with Gabriel, Harry decides to figure things out on his own. After enlisting the help of a talented reporter named Norah from Frontline, Harry decides to visit Norman, as only he would know about Gabriel. Harry and Norah eventually visit the Raft where they find Norman in his cell, consumed by madness. Harry demands to know about Gabriel, but Norman is unresponsive. Frustrated, Harry and Norah begin to leave, but before they exit Norman briefly returns to his senses and tells Harry that Gabriel is indeed Norman's son.

Trying to make sense of everything, Harry visits May Parker's work where he plans to volunteer. On his way, he realizes that he is being followed by the FBI. It is then revealed through FBI security footage that Gabriel is the one who stole the American Son armor and has been using the armor all along. Meanwhile, Gabriel confronts the American Son armor and is revealed to have developed a split personality similar to Norman's after his exposure to the Goblin Formula. This split personality explains to Gabriel that it represents all that is good in his soul and will use the American Son armor to undo each of Gabriel's crimes. After an intense psychological battle, Gabriel appears to gain the upper hand and proceeds with his plan.

Still attempting to understand Gabriel's plans, Harry determines that, in order for Gabriel to truly hurt him, he will attempt to abduct an innocent person and lay a trap. Harry then rushes to find Norah. Meanwhile, the police arrive at Gabriel's hideout, but are unable to rescue Norah because of the American Son's interference. Harry manages to sneak in through one of his father's secret tunnels and confronts his half-brother. As the police prepare to make another attempt to save Norah, Harry frees her and gets the young reporter to safety. With Norah out of harm's way Gabriel and Harry engage in an epic battle. During the fight, Harry attempts to convince Gabriel that Norman is evil and that attempting to follow in his footsteps is madness. Gabriel refuses to listen and continues his attempts to kill Harry. Saddened by his brother's choice, Harry hacks the American Son armor and knocks Gabriel unconscious. The battle causes the warehouse to go up in flames, trapping Gabriel and Harry inside, but Spider-Man arrives and saves them. Afterward, Norah visits Harry in his coffee shop, and notices a bottle of oxycodone in Harry's things. Troubled by what she finds, Norah concludes that Harry has a drug problem and resolves to help him through it.

After many near-encounters, Carlie Cooper and Peter Parker meet at the coffee shop. Harry and MJ are there and the four are talking when Lily bursts through the wall, followed by an attacking team of supervillains. MJ asks Harry to help Lily Hollister who has gone into labor, but they are held captive by Doctor Octopus. Spider-Man manages to save them and rescue Lily's newborn baby from the supervillains. Harry and MJ take Lily to get medical care, but Carlie was too angry with Lily to accompany them. When Spider-Man secures the baby from Doctor Octopus he runs an analysis on a sample of the baby's DNA and finds it matches Harry's, and thus he is the child's true father. Spider-Man encourages Harry to raise his son on his own and start a new life. Soon thereafter, Harry prepares to leave New York with the baby named Stanley. At his going-away party, Harry encounters former NYPD officer Vin Gonzales reveals he has a Green Goblin tattoo. After Gonzales relays a message from Norman, Harry shocks the man with a taser and beats him.

Months later, Harry is shown in Seattle, Washington living with his son. He is shown to have completely changed his appearance, having shaved his head and grown a beard.

All-New, All-Different Marvel
As part of the All-New, All-Different Marvel branding, Harry Osborn and his young son Stanley finally came out of hiding, following his father's, the Goblin King, defeat. Going back to his usual look, Harry started using his mother's maiden name of Lyman and has started working at Parker Industries where he is in charge of Parker Industries' New York office when revealed to the Human Torch by Spider-Man. His sons Normie and Stanley like Regent, until the time when all superhumans are disappearing without a traces caused by a superhuman known as the Regent, while Harry is meeting with Mary Jane and Betty Brant, Harry stumbles upon seeing a same logo as the Regent's on Augustus Roman's Empire Unlimited company, and soon realizes, along with Mary Jane, that when he saw a logo beneath Augustus' ripped shirt during the time of Zodiac's attacks on the opening of Horizon University that Augustus is, in fact, Regent, thus sending Betty to meet Augustus to prove if he is Regent or not. As Harry realizes that, Augustus kidnaps Betty. Harry must do it himself to save Betty and the other captured superhumans, knowing that he may be captured soon enough, but manage to contact Spider-Man with Parker Industries' webware created by Clayton/Clash before Regent captures him immediately. With a portion of Clayton's Clash soundwave tech on Parker Industries' webware, Harry manages to break free and contact Spider-Man again before the Empire Unlimited's guards capture him, until Spider-Man arrives and soon releases the other superhumans and Betty, surrounding Regent for good.

Later in the storyline "Go Down Swinging", Harry returns, using the Osborn name after his father again terrorizes the city as the Red Goblin using the Carnage symbiote before being imprisoned once more, even after Emily Osborn turns up alive. He is determined to redeem his family's name from his father's villainous legacy and to be a responsible parent to his sons.

Kindred

It is revealed over the course of Nick Spencer's run as writer on The Amazing Spider-Man that, upon dying, Harry's soul was transported to Hell, where he encountered the demon Mephisto, who labels him as the Goblin Prince. The demon asks Harry why he never told Peter on his deathbed any of the schemes he had set in motion to torture him after his passing, with Harry confessing that there was no time, and that he was ashamed. Harry's soul is kept in hell tortured by demons while a clone version maintains a life on Earth.

Many years later, a demon, going by the name of Kindred, rose through the ranks and ultimately hand picked Mysterio to assist him in carrying out a plan of retaliation against Peter Parker, whom Kindred held accountable for an unpardonable sin. When Kindred meets with Norman Osborn in Ravencroft, Norman's Cletus Kasady persona states to Kindred that he has a message for him from Norman, who states that he is "so proud of him".

In a final battle with the Kindreds, Norman reveals the A.I. Harry had been influenced by Mephisto the entire time and apologizes to Harry for selling his soul. Harry then tells Peter he "made up" the twins and fights with his friend against them. During the battle Harry tells Norman to get to safety; Norman is shocked at this to which Harry replies "Guess the apple fell kinda far from the tree." When Harry steps between Norman and a blow from Gabriel's Kindred body, he is fatally wounded. Collapsing into Peter's arms, Harry tells Peter this was always how it was "meant to be" and dies. Doctor Strange decides to gamble with Mephisto for the fate of Harry Osborn's soul and succeeds. His victory exorcises Mephisto from the twins, allowing them to degenerate and pass on for a final time, and Harry's soul is freed from Mephisto's grasp. Peter and MJ grieve the loss of their friend.

Powers and abilities
For most of his life, Harry Osborn had no superhuman abilities.

As Green Goblin
After exposing himself to his father's formula, he takes the reins of the second Green Goblin, causing him to become much stronger, cunning and agile. The glider he carries has swords, along with usual Goblin technology.

As American Son
Harry's clone also had temporary access to the American Son armor.

Harry A.I/Kindred
When the Harry Osborn AI created the Kindred twins, the assistance of Mephisto bestowed the twins with the demonically enhanced capabilities of immortality, super-strength, and control over the centipedes like the ones that can protrude out of them. In addition, they can perform magic and revive the dead.

Reception

Accolades 
 In 2014, IGN ranked Harry Osborn 6th in their "Top 25 Spider-Man Villains" list.
 In 2020, CBR.com ranked Harry Osborn 6th in their "Spider-Man: 10 Most Powerful Members Of The Osborn Family" list.
 In 2021, Screen Rant included Harry Osborn in their "10 Best Marvel Legacy Villains Who Lived Up To Their Predecessor" list and in their "15 Most Powerful Variants Of Green Goblin In Marvel Comics" list.
 In 2022, CBR.com ranked Harry Osborn 2nd in their "10 Best Marvel Legacy Villains" list and 3rd in their "10 Best Versions Of Green Goblin From The Comics" list.

Other versions

MC2
In the MC2 universe, Harry's death in Spectacular Spider-Man #200 also remains valid and he was allowed to rest in peace. His widow Liz continues her relationship with Franklyn Nelson and raises her and Normie (Harry's son), but she later succumbs to a fatal illness; her death sends Normie over the edge and, like his father and grandfather before him, takes up the Green Goblin mantle and vows revenge on Peter Parker. After several emotionally charged encounters with Spider-Girl, Normie eventually reclaims his sanity and the blood feud between the Parkers and the Osborns is finally brought to an end.

Ultimate Marvel

The Ultimate Marvel incarnation of Harry Osborn is the rich son of Norman Osborn and Martha Osborn as well as the best friend and tutoring subject of Peter Parker at Midtown High, who is one of Peter's few friends in high school and also briefly dates Mary Jane "MJ" Watson. After Norman eventually subjects himself to the OZ Formula, the Green Goblin kills Martha and attempts to kill Harry, because of which he initially goes missing but eventually shows up outside Midtown High following Spider-Man's battle with Green Goblin there which nearly destroyed the school and tells MJ, Flash Thompson and Kenny Kong that the monster is his dad. Harry is placed into a relative's custody, but he eventually returned to his father and is brainwashed by Dr. Miles Warren to forget the previous events. During another battle with Spider-Man, the Sinister Six and the Ultimates in front of the White House, Harry stops his father and he is taken into S.H.I.E.L.D. custody. He is later used as Nick Fury's bargaining piece to negotiate with Norman. Harry begins to blame everyone around him for the situation, and his second personality Shaw (introduced by his father after many years of hypnotic therapy) begins to take control. Harry eventually turns into the Hobgoblin creature, gaining super strength, pyrokinesis and orange Goblin-like super skin. Harry tries to stop himself during a battle with Spider-Man, but Shaw takes over and is wounded by S.H.I.E.L.D. soldiers. He is once again used by S.H.I.E.L.D. to attract his father, but the two end up doing battle, which leaves Harry dead. Peter later makes a speech that honors his friend. It was eventually revealed that the OZ formula gives Norman and Spider-Man immortality, making it possible that Harry is still alive somewhere.

Marvel Zombies
In Marvel Zombies: Return #1, Zombie Spider-Man is taken to an alternate reality where it is the past and Peter is still in college, Harry and Gwen are alive, etc. Harry is shown hanging out (with a mustache) with Peter, MJ and Gwen. However, he is later shown being eaten by a zombified Sinister Six, along with his friends.

Spider-Man: Clone Saga
In the simplified re-telling of the Clone Saga, Harry is revealed as the mastermind behind Peter and Ben Reilly's troubles throughout the story. Having secretly survived his final battle with Spider-Man, and still unhinged due to the side-effects of the Goblin formula, Harry carries out a vengeful campaign against the Spider-Men with the aid of Kaine. His plans also include the cloning of his deceased father, who apparently was killed by his Goblin Glider in this reality. Harry soon heads out to attack Ben Reilly in the guise of the Green Goblin. His plans are thwarted when Kaine switches sides. The Norman clone, who is not insane due to not being exposed to the Goblin Formula, tries to convince Harry to stop before sacrificing himself by jumping in front of the moving Goblin Glider (akin to Ben Reilly's death in the main universe). The series concludes with an irate Harry swearing vengeance.

Spider-Man: Life Story
Spider-Man: Life Story features an alternate continuity where the characters naturally age after Peter Parker becomes Spider-Man in 1962. In 1966, Peter has Norman arrested to prevent the Green Goblin from hurting anyone, leaving Harry in charge of Oscorp. In 1977, Harry is engaged to Mary Jane, but shows signs of a drug addiction brought upon by the stress of his position and his father's imprisonment. Norman convinces Harry to attack Miles Warren as the Black Goblin to retrieve his clone, but Harry discovers that Miles also cloned Peter and Gwen Stacy in the process. Harry realizes Norman cloned Peter because Norman still considered Peter the more worthy heir and attacks him. After Peter convinces Harry of his father's manipulations, Harry blows up the facility, killing all the clones except Peter's. However, Miles reveals that the "Gwen" Peter was with was actually her clone while the real Gwen died in the explosion, leaving Harry wracked with guilt. By one year later, he has broken up with Mary Jane and left her with a significant amount of money before disappearing. In 1995, Otto Octavius breaks into Oscorp and threatens Harry into letting him use equipment to study Peter and his clone, Ben, to find a way to clone himself. Chaos erupts after he discovers that Peter is supposedly the clone while Ben is the original. When Otto attempts to kill them both, Harry sacrifices himself to save Peter. As he dies in Peter's arms, he apologizes for being weak with Otto and his father, though Peter reassures him that he was not. It is later revealed that Otto was allowed to enter Oscorp by an elderly Norman, who has a heart attack and dies after learning of Harry's death.

Spider-Gwen
In this version, Harry Osborn is a social outcast at high school who is constantly bullied due to a rumor that he tried to burn his old prep school down; Flash Thompson notably bullies him and nicknames him the "Green Goblin". Gwen Stacy and Peter befriend him out of pity, and Harry asks Gwen out to the prom, angering Peter. He witnesses Peter transform into the Lizard, fight Spider-Woman and die. At Peter's funeral, he feels guilty that he did not do anything to prevent Peter's death, and disappears from school for two years. He returns one night tells Gwen that he joined the army and S.H.I.E.L.D. after Peter's death and plans to avenge him by taking down Spider-Woman. During his fight with Spider-Woman, he takes the Lizard serum to overpower the heroine, but runs away after discovering Spider-Woman is Gwen. He then goes on the run from S.H.I.E.L.D. and is pursued by ninjas belonging to the Hand, Wolverine, and Shadowcat before fully transforming into the Lizard. Figuring out that there is a connection with their powers and a mysterious substance given to her by Matt Murdock, Gwen manages to get the Lizard serum out of Harry's blood and combines it with the substance, which forms the Venom symbiote.

Spider-Geddon
During the "Spider-Geddon" storyline, the Earth-44145 version of Harry Osborn arrives at Oscorp and makes his way through the building. The narration is in the form of a letter to Harry from Peter Parker on what is happening at Oscorp. As a six-armed Norman Osborn is informed of Harry moving through Oscorp and having been secretly armed, he is told that Harry is on the 15th floor near Mr. Warren's lab. Becoming Spider-Man and arriving where a warped Cosmic Cube is located, Norman confronts Harry who dons the Kobold armor. It was revealed during the fight that Norman killed Peter Parker as a badly-injured Harry fires a laser beam at the warped Cosmic Cube.
During the return of the Inheritors, Spider-Gwen's device to travel through the multiverse got destroyed by Verna and then Gwen got stranded in an alternate universe. In this universe Peter Parker and this universe's Gwen Stacy got a job at Oscorp and Peter wanted to create a cure for cancer, after his Uncle Ben died from it. Peter was experimenting with spider venom to create the cure but one of the spiders bit Harry Osborn making Harry this universe's Spider-Man. Harry alongside Gwen Stacy as this universe's Green Goblin started to fight crime together, until during a fight with the Sandman, both Harry and Gwen's father got killed.

Infinity Wars 
In the new universe created by the folding of reality in Infinity Wars, Harry's father, Norman, is fused with Jack Russel and becomes Goblin by Night. This version of Harry is the best friend and partner of Peter Spector (a fusion of Peter Parker and Marc Spector), who operates as the vigilante Arachknight. When Peter tries to kill Norman as revenge for Norman killing Peter's family, Harry intervenes and saves his father. After Ben and May were killed by Norman, Harry discovered his father was cursed into an uncontrollable Goblin, and caused him into killing both Peter's uncle and aunt against his will. While Harry is taking care of his father, Norman loses control and bites Harry, passing the curse to him. Harry becomes the new Goblin by Night and runs away, leaving Peter and a now cured Norman to vow to find a cure for him.

In other media

Harry Osborn has been adapted to other media including cartoons, films, games, toys, collectibles, miscellaneous memorabilia, and has appeared as a supporting character in numerous computer and video games.

In television, the character first was featured in Fox Kids' Spider-Man (1994–1998) voiced by Gary Imhoff, Spider-Man: The New Animated Series (2003) voiced by Ian Ziering, The Spectacular Spider-Man (2008–2009) voiced by James Arnold Taylor, Ultimate Spider-Man (2012–2017) voiced by Matt Lanter, and Spider-Man (2017–2020) voiced by Max Mittelman. Harry Osborn will appear in the Disney+ animated series Spider-Man: Freshman Year (2024).

Harry Osborn/New Goblin was also featured in a trilogy of live-action films directed by Sam Raimi played by James Franco, and the 2014 film The Amazing Spider-Man 2 portrayed by Dane DeHaan, directed by Marc Webb.

The character cameos in the 2018 video game Spider-Man and its 2020 spin-off Spider-Man: Miles Morales, voiced by Scott Porter.

Collected editions

References

External links
Harry Osborn at Marvel.com
Spider-Man 3: The Spider & The Goblin: Peter Parker and Harry Osborn - A retrospective at Marvel.com
Harry's Profile at Spiderfan.org
 
 Harry Osborn at Comicvine

Action film villains
Characters created by Stan Lee
Characters created by Steve Ditko
Comics characters introduced in 1965
Fictional business executives
Fictional characters from New York City
Fictional characters with psychiatric disorders
Fictional cocaine users
Fictional drug addicts
Fictional characters with amnesia
Fictional goblins
Fictional Columbia University people
Marvel Comics characters with superhuman strength
Marvel Comics film characters
Marvel Comics superheroes
Marvel Comics male superheroes
Marvel Comics supervillains
Marvel Comics male supervillains
Marvel Comics mutates
Spider-Man characters
Green Goblin
Marvel Comics demons
Clone characters in comics
Marvel Comics characters who use magic
Fictional soul collectors